Mayflower Transit, LLC, a subsidiary of UniGroup, is an American moving company based in Fenton, Missouri. Mayflower operates as an agent owned co-op to coordinate loads, packing, and third-party services. Agents are independent contractors each focusing on a specific local area. While each agent maintains their own local and intrastate business, the co-op operates in the interstate and international service lines.

History
Mayflower was founded in Indianapolis, Indiana in 1927 by Conrad M. Gentry and Don F. Kenworthy. In March 1995, it was acquired by UniGroup, a transportation and relocation services company with headquarters in suburban St. Louis, Missouri.

Baltimore Colts relocation

Mayflower was involved in the highly controversial March 28, 1984 move of the Baltimore Colts NFL franchise from Baltimore to Indianapolis. At the time, the company was still based in Indianapolis. The company's leadership, including CEO John B. Smith, took an active role in Indianapolis's offer to acquire the team. Prior to the Colts' ownership deciding to move to Indianapolis, the team was considering several other cities, including Phoenix, Arizona, but Baltimore had pushed the Maryland legislature to use eminent domain to keep the Colts in the city. The legislature began processing the eminent domain claim on March 27. This forced the team to close the deal with Indianapolis on the afternoon of March 28 and arrange for an immediate overnight move to avoid the state's potentially seizing the team's assets.

Mayflower leadership were informed of need for an immediate move on the afternoon of the 28th and began tracking down empty tractor-trailer units that could be sent to the Colts' Owings Mills, Maryland, training facility to facilitate the move. At the time, Mayflower had approximately 3,000 trucks, but it took several hours to find 14 empty trucks, from as far away as northern New Jersey and southern Virginia, that could reach the facility that evening. The company also marshaled 45 packers and movers from their Washington offices and sent them via bus to the Colts' facility.

The bus and trucks arrived at approximately 10 PM on the 28th. The movers and drivers were not told the purpose of the job or the eventual destination and Pete Ward, an administrative assistant with the Colts' at the time, reported that upon arrival several movers asked if the facility was an embassy since the Washington-based crew were familiar with overnight embassy relocations. Trucks left as they were filled with the last truck leaving around 4 AM on the 29th. Drivers were instructed to avoid proximity with each other so as not to appear to be a caravan, drive about 100 miles west, and rest until morning. The next morning at around 9 AM, the drivers were told that their destination was Indianapolis, and all of the trucks arrived by the morning of the 30th.

An Associated Press image of one of Mayflower's trucks leaving the Colts' facility in the snow that night became an iconic representation of the team's move in news coverage following the event.

References

External links

Moving companies of the United States
Agent-owned companies
Companies based in St. Louis County, Missouri
Transport companies established in 1927
1927 establishments in Indiana
Baltimore Colts